Sula is a census-designated place (CDP) in Ravalli County, Montana, United States. The population was 37 at the 2010 census.

The area was originally called Ross's Hole from Alexander Ross, a Hudson’s Bay Company fur trader who had traveled through the area in spring 1824. In 1889, settlers named the post office after Ursula (Sula for short) Thompson, purportedly the first non-Indian child born in Ross’s Hole.

Geography
It lies along the East Fork of the Bitterroot River at the west end of Ross' Hole, a wide valley surrounded by mountains.

Climate
This climatic region is typified by large seasonal temperature differences, with warm to hot (and often humid) summers and cold (sometimes severely cold) winters.  According to the Köppen Climate Classification system, Sula has a humid continental climate, abbreviated "Dfb" on climate maps.

Demographics

References

Census-designated places in Ravalli County, Montana
Census-designated places in Montana